Heriberto Simmons was an Argentine amateur footballer, who played in Club Atlético River Plate, and the Argentina national team.

Biography 

Simmons was born in Buenos Aires, son of a family of English roots. He made its debut in 1913 as midfielder on the River Plate. On August 24, 1913, River played its first classic against Boca Juniors. The match was played in Avellaneda, with a score of 2–1 in favor of River. The formation of River team was Carlos Isola; Arturo Chiappe, Pedro Calneggia; Heriberto Simmons, Cándido García; Atilio Peruzzi; Luis Galeano, Antonio Ameral Pereyra; Alberto Penney, Fernando Roldán and Roberto Graga Patrao.

In 1914, Simmons obtained the Copa de Competencia. That same year he won the Copa de Competencia Chevallier Boutell, playing against Bristol Football Club, and on January 9, 1921, he obtains its second national championship also playing for River.
 
In 1916 Heriberto Simmons played for the Selección Argentina winning the titles Copa Newton and the Copa Círculo de la Prensa, final vs Uruguay played at the stadium of Avellaneda, with an Argentine triumph 7–2, with goals scored by Hiller 3, Hayes 2, Simmons and Cabano (ar).

Titles

References

External links 
www.lanacion.com.ar - river-el-siglo-de-un-campeon 

Argentine footballers
Argentina international footballers
Footballers from Buenos Aires
Club Atlético River Plate footballers
Argentine people of English descent
1890 births
1950 deaths
Association football midfielders
Argentine people of Italian descent
Río de la Plata